= Bek Condello =

Australian author and public speaker

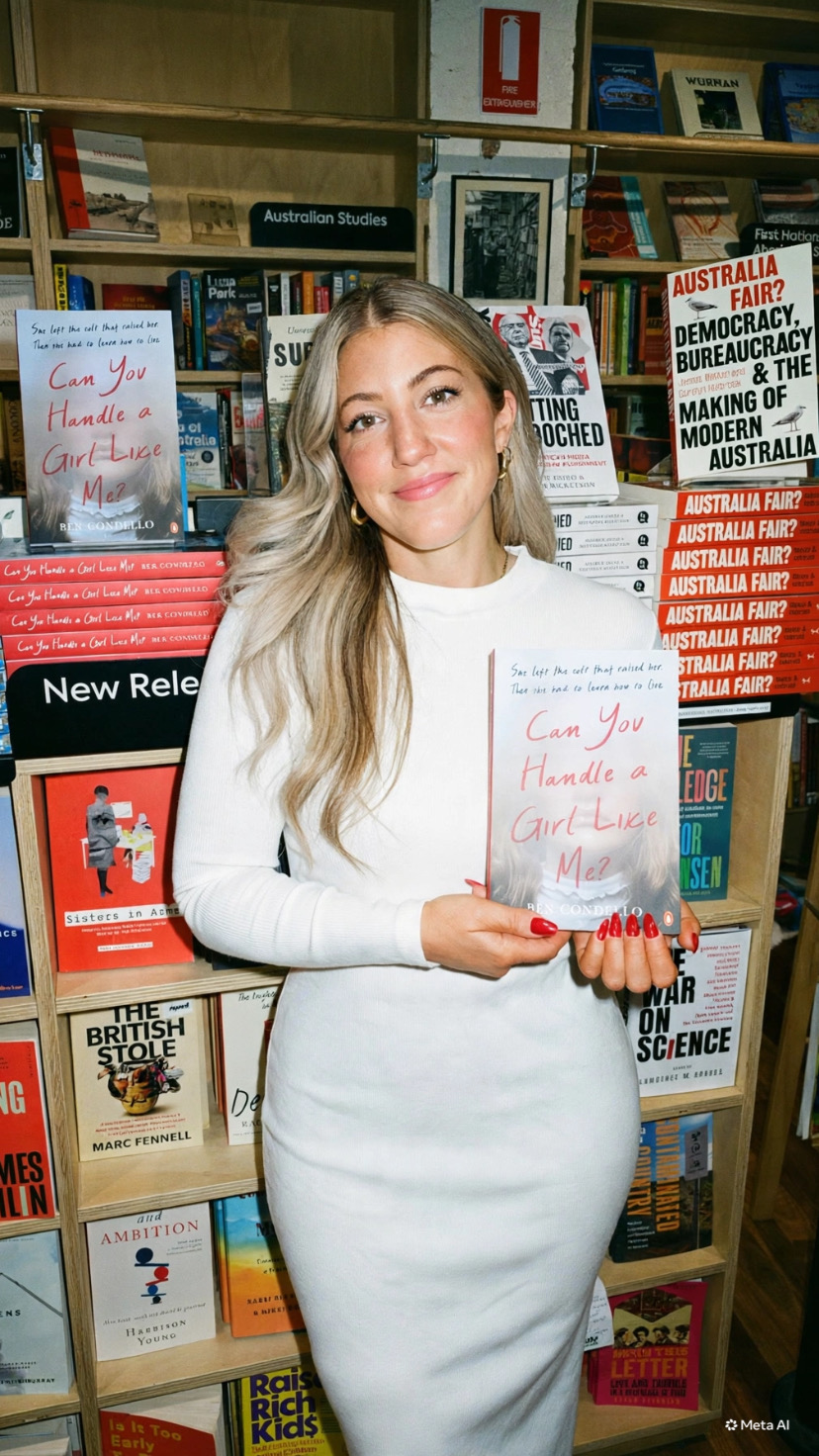
- Occupations: Author, public speaker
- Notable work: Can You Handle a Girl Like Me?

Bek Condello is an Australian author and public speaker. She is the author of Can You Handle a Girl Like Me?, a memoir published by Penguin Random House Australia in 2026. The book recounts Condello's upbringing in the Geelong Revival Centre, a doomsday Pentecostal religious community in Australia, and her experiences after leaving.

== Early life ==
Condello was raised in Canberra within the Geelong Revival Centre (GRC), a Pentecostal church established by Pastor Noel Hollins, which her parents joined before she was born. She has said that during her childhood, the church's influence extended into every part of daily life, including her education, friendships, dating, healthcare access and family relationships.

Condello moved states as a young adult to marry a husband she hardly knew, pressured into the marriage by the church, and later left both the marriage and the GRC by her early thirties, describing anyone who leaves the community as being cut off from family, identity and history. In a 2026 interview, Condello said it was not until she began writing her memoir that she recognised parts of her childhood as abusive. Condello has also spoken about the isolation of growing up in a closed-off community, and described rebuilding her identity and navigating relationships as an adult.

== Writing ==
Condello's debut memoir, Can You Handle a Girl Like Me?, was published by Penguin Random House Australia in 2026, following eight years of writing. Condello has said she finished writing the memoir a month after the release of Secrets We Keep: Pray Harder, a 2024 LiSTNR podcast series investigating the Geelong Revival Centre, the Pentecostal church in which Condello was raised. Hosted by Australian investigative journalist Richard Baker, the series drew on exclusive audio Baker obtained over a two-year investigation, along with testimony from former members of the church. Baker, a former investigative journalist for The Age, had previously created and hosted several other Australian investigative podcasts. Condello has said that after the podcast's release, she connected with Baker, who encouraged her to publish her memoir; Baker later interviewed Condello following the book's publication.

== Advocacy and public speaking ==
In 2025, the Parliament of Victoria established an inquiry into cults and high-control groups, examining the impact of these groups on individuals, families and communities. Condello made a submission to the inquiry and shared her experience growing up within the Geelong Revival Centre.

== Career ==
Alongside her writing, Condello has worked for several years in community services and advocacy roles in Australia and internationally, focusing on gendered issues including sexual violence prevention, support for First Nations women experiencing domestic violence, and assisting unhoused young women to find stable housing.
